Eukaryotic peptide chain release factor GTP-binding subunit ERF3A is an enzyme that in humans is encoded by the GSPT1 gene.

Interactions 

GSPT1 has been shown to interact with BIRC2.

References

Further reading

External links